The Sasun Resistance by the Armenian militia against the Ottoman Empire may refer to:
Sasun Resistance (1894)
Sasun Resistance (1904)